Marco Angelo Monti (born 2 July 1967) is an Italian former footballer who played for his country Italy in the Italy U21, Italy U18, Italy U17, Italy U16 and numerous clubs, including Inter Milan, Lazio, Atalanta, Reggiana, Ravenna and Lecco.

Monti is currently working at Internazionale-Inter Milan FC as a Technical Director-Academy alongside youth team coach role (Under-12, Under-14, Under-16, Under-18). He was also featured in the television programme Football's Next Star, a football reality show aimed at British and Irish youth players competing to win a contract with Internazionale. Monti has played alongside some very big names in the world of football such as Maradona while Maradona was playing for Napoli and Marco Monti played for Lazio.Marco also played against the likes of Ruud Gullit, Frank Rijkaard, Marco van Basten, Paolo Maldini and many more such great legends.

Players coached
o Mario Balotelli
o Davide Santon
o Obafemi Martins
o Leonardo Bonucci
o Jonathan Biabiany
o Mattia Destro
o Luca Siligardi
o Andrej Beleckij
o Rene Krhin
o Francesco Bolzoni
o Lorenzo Crisetig
o Marco Andreolli

References 

timesofindia.indiatimes.com
archive.indianexpress.com
inter.it

1967 births
Living people
Italian footballers
Italy youth international footballers
Association football defenders
Serie A players
Serie B players
Inter Milan players
S.S. Lazio players
Atalanta B.C. players
Reggina 1914 players
Ravenna F.C. players
Calcio Lecco 1912 players
Virtus Bergamo Alzano Seriate 1909 players
Sportspeople from Monza
Footballers from Lombardy